JFS may refer to:

Computing
 JavaServer Faces, Java web application framework
 Journaling file system, a type of file system
 JFS (file system), a journaling file system by IBM
 Veritas File System, another journaling file system called JFS and OnlineJFS in HP-UX

Organisations
 Jabhat Fateh al-Sham, a Salafist jihadist rebel group fighting in the Syrian Civil War
 Jewish Family Services, former name of the Jewish Board of Family and Children's Services
 John Fishwick & Sons, an English bus company
 JFS (school), a Jewish secondary school in North London, England
 The John Fisher School, a Catholic school in Purley, Surrey, England

Publications
 Journal of Food Science
 Journal of Futures Studies

See also
 JFFS, another, similarly named, journaling file system